Capcom Arcade Stadium is an arcade video game compilation by Capcom. It includes 32 arcade games originally published by Capcom between 1984 and 2001. The compilation was initially released on Nintendo Switch in February 2021, then on PlayStation 4, Windows, and Xbox One later in May 2021, and Amazon Luna in May 2022.

A sequel, Capcom Arcade 2nd Stadium, was released on July 22, 2022.

Overview

Capcom Arcade Stadium
Capcom Arcade Stadium features 1943: The Battle of Midway as a free inclusion, with the remaining games purchasable as downloadable content (DLC). Ghosts 'n Goblins was made individually purchasable, while the rest were initially grouped into three packs of ten games, with each pack spanning a particular time period: Dawn of the Arcade (1984–1988), Arcade Revolution (1989–1992), and Arcade Evolution (1992–2001). In October 2021, it was announced that the games would also be made available as individual purchases in addition to the packs. In June 2022, Street Fighter II  was made free to download until July 2022 to celebrate the upcoming release of Capcom Arcade 2nd Stadium, as well as the game's 1st anniversary and Capcom's 39th anniversary.

The games run in an emulator which adds the ability to rewind gameplay, select difficulty, adjust game speed, and use nostalgic visual filters to simulate vintage arcade CRT screens. Minor graphical alterations to the Street Fighter II games include the removal of the Rising Sun in E. Honda's stage, and the replacement of the Flag of Hong Kong SAR with the flag of the People's Republic of China for Fei Long in the character selection screen. In May 2021, Capcom released paid DLC enabling an invincibility cheat for each game.

Capcom Arcade 2nd Stadium

In May 2021, Capcom announced its intention for the collection to be expanded, and invited fans to suggest ideas through Twitter. On April 11, 2022, Capcom announced a sequel called Capcom Arcade 2nd Stadium, which was released on July 22, 2022, for Nintendo Switch, PlayStation 4, Windows, and Xbox One. The collection features 32 new games, including SonSon as a free inclusion, and Three Wonders as a launch bonus for pre-orders and early purchases of Capcom Fighting Collection.

Reception 

Upon Capcom Arcade Stadiums initial December 2020 announcement, Comic Book Resources found it to be an improvement over the 2013 predecessor Capcom Arcade Cabinet for the PlayStation 3 and Xbox 360, by almost doubling the library. However, it lamented the trend of emulation "retreads" from Nintendo and Capcom: "The downside is that these companies have normalized the practice of re-selling consumers classic games every console generation, and that's a price gamers shouldn't have to pay."

Although noting that several of the games have been available in previous compilations such as Capcom Beat 'Em Up Bundle, Nintendo Life praised the selection of shoot 'em ups in Capcom Arcade Stadium, which includes the console debuts of games such as Progear and 1944: The Loop Master.

References

External links
 

2021 video games
Capcom games
Capcom video game compilations
Head-to-head arcade video games
Vertically scrolling shooters
Pacific War video games
Nintendo Switch games
PlayStation 4 games
PlayStation Network games
Video games developed in Japan
Windows games
Xbox One games